Ermengol in Catalan, Armengol or Armengod in Spanish, Ermengaud in French, Ermengau in Occitan, and Hermengaudius in Latin is a Germanic given name of Gothic origin meaning "ready for battle". The name was Arabised during the Middle Ages as أرمقند, Armaqand.

Ermengol of Rouergue
Saint Ermengol
Ermengol I of Urgell
Ermengol II of Urgell
Ermengol III of Urgell
Ermengol IV of Urgell
Ermengol V of Urgell
Ermengol VI of Urgell
Ermengol VII of Urgell
Ermengol VIII of Urgell
Ermengol IX of Urgell
Ermengol X of Urgell
Ermengol Blasi
Ermengol Graus

It was also the surname of a late medieval family of the Languedoc:
Matfre Ermengau
Peire Ermengau